The Interfaith Center for Sustainable Development (ICSD), is a nonprofit organization, founded and directed by Rabbi Yonatan Neril in 2010. Based in Jerusalem., the ICSD argues that there is a connection between religion and ecology and mobilizes faith communities to act. ICSD manifests these goals primarily through five projects. The group played a lead role in an interfaith climate repentance ceremony that took place during the United Nations climate change summit in 2022 that was criticized by some religious figures.

Eco Bible 
The Eco Bible is an ecological commentary on the Hebrew Bible. Eco Bible draws on 3,000 years of Biblical commentary by Jewish sages. It is focused on the Five Books of Moses, otherwise known The Torah.

Eco Preacher 1-2-3 
In an effort to encourage clergy to preach and teach on Christian ecology at least once a month, ICSD and the Rev. Dr. Leah Schade partnered to develop a resource called EcoPreacher 1-2-3. Drawing from Eco Bible, Dr. Schade provides sermon preparation for preaching about caring for God’s Creation.

Engaging Seminaries Project 
This project encourages Spiritual divinity and theological schools and seminaries to integrate lessons on faith and ecology. As part of the project, ICSD has published reports on faith and ecology courses being offered by seminaries around the world.

ICSD also organizes conferences for seminary deans, faculty, and others on religion and ecology. They have co-organized six conferences so far: The Southeast Symposium on Ecologically Informed Theological Education in Atlanta in March 2018, The Midwest Symposium on Ecologically Informed Theological Education in 2017, the Washington D.C. Symposium on Ecologically Informed Theological Education in 2017, a New York City conference at Union Theological Seminary in 2016, a Jerusalem conference in 2015, and a Jerusalem conference in 2014.

Report on Faith and Ecology Courses in North American Seminaries 
ICSD published a Report on Faith and Ecology Courses in North American Seminaries. The release of the report in June 2015 coincided with the release of Pope Francis’s Encyclical "laudato si: On care for our Common Home." The report was revised and expanded in September and November, 2015, following input from seminary deans. Research for the report indicated that the number and diversity of courses on faith and ecology at institutions training seminarians in North America increased in the past number of years. Out of 231 seminaries investigated, over 165 courses were found to have been offered at over 55 seminaries in the United States and Canada.

Eco Israel Tours 
Eco Israel Tours is a branch of the ICSD which provides a range of eco-tourism programs in Israel.

Jewish Eco Seminars

Jewish Eco Seminars (JES) is another ICSD initiative that works with a range of Jews in Israel and North America to increase their ecological awareness and strengthen their Jewish identity.

References

Interfaith organizations